The following is a list of schools that participate in NCAA Division I softball, according to NCAA.com. These teams compete to go to Oklahoma City, Oklahoma, and ASA Hall of Fame Stadium for the Women's College World Series. (For schools whose athletic branding does not directly correspond with the school name, the athletic branding is in parentheses.)

Conference affiliations reflect those in the upcoming 2023 season. Years of conference changes, indicated in footnotes, reflect softball seasons, which take place in the calendar year after a conference change takes effect.

Future programs

See also
 List of NCAA Division II softball programs
 List of NCAA Division III softball programs
 List of NAIA softball programs
 List of NCAA Division I baseball programs

References

N
Softball
NCAA Division I softball